The 1967 Marshall Thundering Herd football team was an American football team that represented Marshall University in the Mid-American Conference (MAC) during the 1967 NCAA University Division football season. In its ninth and final season under head coach Charlie Snyder, the team compiled a 0–10 record (0–6 against conference opponents), finished in seventh place out of seven teams in the MAC, and was outscored by a total of 311 to 72. Tim McLaughlin and Richie Robb were the team captains. The team played its home games at Fairfield Stadium in Huntington, West Virginia.

Schedule

References

Marshall
Marshall Thundering Herd football seasons
College football winless seasons
Marshall Thundering Herd football